On occasion, sports books have been used as source material for film adaptations. Popular sports in the United States such as baseball and American football have been adapted to film. Books about sports such as boxing, bullfighting, cockfighting, football, hockey, hunting have also been adapted.

Baseball

 * television film.

Comedies

 ♠ The book Fever Pitch is about a fan of football and Arsenal Football Club in particular, not the baseball team, the Boston Red Sox.

Basketball

 * television film.

Bodybuilding

Boxing

Bullfighting

Running of the Bulls

Buzkashi

Car racing

Comedies

Cockfighting
(Popular and legal in Mexico)

Cycling

Diving

 * television film.

Falconry

Fencing

 ♠ Gen. George Patton relaxes in occupied Bavaria with fencing and horseback riding.
 * television film.

Fishing

 * television film.

Football/soccer

Football, American
Professional, college, high school

 * television film.

Comedies

Off the field
(Terrorism became a regular part of news reports in the early 1970s, and this theme was extended to popular fiction.)

Football, Australian

Football, Canadian
Professional and university

 * television film.

Golf

 * television film.

Gymnastics

Ice hockey

 * television film.

Horse racing

Comedies

Overland

Hot air ballooning

Hunting

Fox hunting

Game

 ♠ A roman à clef about director John Huston filming The African Queen.

Game birds

 ♠ A duck-hunting grandfather (Jean Gabin) takes on a gang of drug traffickers.

Hiking

Hurling

Jai alai

Kite flying

Lacrosse
(Lacrosse is the official national (summer) sport of Canada)

 ♠ Ernie Davis plays briefly with fellow football star Jim Brown, who was also a lacrosse superstar at Syracuse University.

Marathon

Marathon dancing

Motorcycle racing

Mountaineering

 * television film.

Polo

 ♠ Polo-playing US cavalrymen resist Japanese invasion.

Roller derby

Rowing

 ♠ Two rowers are recruited by the CIA, and the sport follows the agents through their lives.
 * television film.

Rugby league

Rugby union

Off the field

Sailing
(Yachting)

 ♠ No plot is currently available for this yachting film.
 * television film.

Scuba diving and snorkelling

Skating

Skiing

 * television film.

Skydiving

Stunt driving

 ♠ The film includes flashbacks of the Wall of Death.
 * television film.

Surfing

Swimming

Tennis

Real tennis 

 ♠ Sigmund Freud plays a match.

Track and field

Wrestling

Historical sports

Chariot racing

 ♠ A chase, rather than a race.

Gladiatorial combat

See also
 List of movies about sports
 Sports film
 Baseball movie
Pages with the same format
 List of films based on arts books
 List of films based on civics books
 List of films based on crime books
 List of films based on film books
 List of films based on spy books
 List of films based on war books
 List of films based on westerns

Bibliography 
 Lavington, Stephen. Virgin Film: Oliver Stone, Virgin Books, London, 2004.
 (fr) Julien Camy and Gérard Camy, Sport&Cinéma, ed. Du Bailli de Suffren, 2016, (1200 films, 60 sports, 80 interviews)

References 

Lists of sports films
Lists of films based on books